General Abe may refer to:

Heisuke Abe (1886–1943), Imperial Japanese Army lieutenant general
Nobuyuki Abe (1875–1953), Imperial Japanese Army general
Norihide Abe (1887–1939), Imperial Japanese Army lieutenant general